Team Cmax Dila was an Italian professional cycling team, which competed in elite road bicycle racing events such as the UCI Women's Road World Cup.

Major wins
2008
Overall Tour de Pologne Feminin, Sara Mustonen

National champions
2009
 Spain Road Race, Marta Vilajosana Andreu

References

Cycling teams based in Spain
UCI Women's Teams
Cycling teams established in 2008